Basalt columns may refer to:
  Columnar basalt
 Columnar joints
 , a geological nature monument near the village Bazaltove, Ukraine

See also
List of places with columnar jointed volcanics